20th Century Masters – The Millennium Collection: The Best of Reba McEntire is a compilation album, released in 2007, by American country music artist Reba McEntire. It is part of the 20th Century Masters – The Millennium Collection series, and it chronicles several hits from McEntire's career.

Critical reception

20th Century Masters – The Millennium Collection: The Best of Reba McEntire received two-and-a-half out of five stars from William Ruhlmann of Allmusic. In his review, Ruhlmann observes that "despite being hits, these songs were not among McEntire's biggest hits."

Track listing

Charts
20th Century Masters – The Millennium Collection: The Best of Reba McEntire peaked at number 45 on the U.S. Billboard Top Country Albums.

References

McEntire, Reba
Reba McEntire compilation albums
2007 greatest hits albums
MCA Records compilation albums
Albums produced by Jimmy Bowen
Albums produced by Jerry Kennedy
Albums produced by Tony Brown (record producer)
Albums produced by Norro Wilson